The 1929 New York Yankees season was the team's 27th season.  The team finished with a record of 88–66, finishing in second place, 18 games behind the Philadelphia Athletics. This ended a streak of three straight World Series appearances for the club. New York was managed by Miller Huggins until his death on September 25. They played at Yankee Stadium.

Regular season 
April 16, 1929: The New York Yankees took to the field with uniform numbers for the first time on the backs on their uniforms, the first team to make them permanent.

Season standings

Record vs. opponents

Roster 
Beginning from that year onward the Yankees put the players' jersey numbers on the backs of their white home and grey road uniforms, making them the first MLB team to put player numbers in their uniforms on a permanent basis.

Player stats

Batting

Starters by position 
Note: Pos = Position; G = Games played; AB = At bats; H = Hits; Avg. = Batting average; HR = Home runs; RBI = Runs batted in

Other batters 
Note: G = Games played; AB = At bats; H = Hits; Avg. = Batting average; HR = Home runs; RBI = Runs batted in

Pitching

Starting pitchers 
Note: G = Games pitched; IP = Innings pitched; W = Wins; L = Losses; ERA = Earned run average; SO = Strikeouts

Other pitchers 
Note: G = Games pitched; IP = Innings pitched; W = Wins; L = Losses; ERA = Earned run average; SO = Strikeouts

Relief pitchers 
Note: G = Games pitched; W = Wins; L = Losses; SV = Saves; ERA = Earned run average; SO = Strikeouts

Awards and honors

League top ten finishers 
Lou Gehrig
 #2 in AL in home runs (35)
 #2 in AL in on-base percentage (.431)
 #3 in AL in runs scored (127)
 #3 in AL in walks (122)
 #4 in AL in RBI (126)
 #4 in AL in slugging percentage (.584)

Tony Lazzeri
 #4 in AL in on-base percentage (.429)

George Pipgras
 #3 in AL in strikeouts (125)

Babe Ruth
 MLB leader in home runs (46)
 MLB leader in slugging percentage (.697)
 #2 in AL in RBI (154)
 #3 in AL in on-base percentage (.430)

Farm system

Notes

References 
1929 New York Yankees at Baseball Reference
1929 New York Yankees team page at www.baseball-almanac.com

New York Yankees seasons
New York Yankees
New York Yankees
1920s in the Bronx